Clarksville is an unincorporated community in Baltimore Hundred, Sussex County, Delaware, United States located just west of Millville. It is centered, more or less, along Delaware Route 26. Many tourists from the Baltimore–Washington metropolitan area pass through the town on their way to and from the Delaware Beaches.

The Blackwater Presbyterian Church and Spring Banke near Clarksville are listed on the National Register of Historic Places.

History
Clarksville's population was 16 in 1900, 63 in 1925, and 200 in 1960. Clarksville formerly had a post office with a ZIP code of 19937; however, the post office closed and the ZIP code was discontinued. Clarksville is currently served by the Ocean View post office with a ZIP code of 19970.

References 

Unincorporated communities in Sussex County, Delaware
Unincorporated communities in Delaware